The Hollywood Recordings is the first studio album by American hip hop group Sa-Ra Creative Partners. It was released on Babygrande Records in 2007.

Track listing

Charts

References

External links
 

2007 debut albums
Babygrande Records albums
Sa-Ra albums
Albums produced by Sa-Ra